Thomas Lloyd was a Welsh Anglican bishop in the first half of the 20th century.

He was born in 1857, educated at Ystrad Meurig School and St David's College, Lampeter, and ordained in 1882. He began his career as a Curate in Denbigh. He held incumbencies at Bala, Abergele and Rhyl.

He was Archdeacon of St Asaph from 1910 and the only Bishop of Maenan (a suffragan bishop to A. G. Edwards, Bishop of St Asaph and Archbishop of Wales) from 1928, holding both posts until his death on 14 March 1935. He was ordained and consecrated a bishop on St Andrew's day (30 November) 1928 at St Asaph Cathedral, by Edwards as Archbishop of Wales.

References

1857 births
Alumni of the University of Wales, Lampeter
19th-century Welsh Anglican priests
Archdeacons of St Asaph
20th-century bishops of the Church in Wales
1935 deaths
Anglican suffragan bishops in Wales